Leodgar Tenga  is a former Tanzania football player who played for Tanzania in the 1980 African Cup of Nations. Following his retirement, he later served as President of the Tanzania Football Federation from 2004 to 2013. During his tenure, Tenga was elected to serve as president of CECAFA in 2007 and was re-elected in 2011 for a second term. He was a member of the CAF Executive Committee under former association President Ahmad Ahmad between 2017 and 2021.

External links
11v11 Profile

Tanzanian footballers
Living people
Tanzania international footballers
1980 African Cup of Nations players
Association footballers not categorized by position
Year of birth missing (living people)
Tanzanian entertainers
Tanzanian men by occupation